The GUID Partition Table (GPT) is a standard for the layout of partition tables of a physical computer storage device, such as a hard disk drive or solid-state drive, using universally unique identifiers, which are also known as globally unique identifiers (GUIDs). Forming a part of the Unified Extensible Firmware Interface (UEFI) standard (Unified EFI Forum-proposed replacement for the PC BIOS), it is nevertheless also used for some BIOS systems, because of the limitations of master boot record (MBR) partition tables, which use 32 bits for logical block addressing (LBA) of traditional 512-byte disk sectors.

All modern personal computer operating systems support GPT. Some, including macOS and Microsoft Windows on the x86 architecture, support booting from GPT partitions only on systems with EFI firmware, but FreeBSD and most Linux distributions can boot from GPT partitions on systems with either the BIOS or the EFI firmware interface.

History 

The Master Boot Record (MBR) partitioning scheme, widely used since the early 1980s, imposed limitations for use of modern hardware. The available size for block addresses and related information is limited to 32 bits. For hard disks with 512byte sectors, the MBR partition table entries allow a maximum size of 2 TiB (2³² × 512bytes) or 2.20 TB (2.20 × 10¹² bytes).

In the late 1990s, Intel developed a new partition table format as part of what eventually became the Unified Extensible Firmware Interface (UEFI). The GUID Partition Table is specified in chapter 5 of the UEFI 2.8 specification. GPT uses 64 bits for logical block addresses, allowing a maximum disk size of 264 sectors. For disks with 512byte sectors, the maximum size is 8 ZiB (264 × 512bytes) or 9.44 ZB (9.44 × 10²¹ bytes). For disks with 4,096byte sectors the maximum size is 64 ZiB (264 × 4,096bytes) or 75.6 ZB (75.6 × 10²¹ bytes).

In 2010, hard-disk manufacturers introduced drives with 4,096byte sectors (Advanced Format). For compatibility with legacy hardware and software, those drives include an emulation technology (512e) that presents 512byte sectors to the entity accessing the hard drive, despite their underlying 4,096byte physical sectors. Performance could be degraded on write operations, when the drive is forced to perform two read-modify-write operations to satisfy a single misaligned 4,096byte write operation. Since April 2014, enterprise-class drives without emulation technology (4K native) have been available on the market.

Readiness of the support for 4 KB logical sectors within operating systems differs among their types, vendors and versions.  For example, Microsoft Windows supports 4K native drives since Windows 8 and Windows Server 2012 (both released in 2012) in UEFI.

Features 
Like MBR, GPTs use logical block addressing (LBA) in place of the historical cylinder-head-sector (CHS) addressing. The protective MBR is stored at LBA 0, and the GPT header is in LBA 1. The GPT header has a pointer to the partition table (Partition Entry Array), which is typically at LBA 2. Each entry on the partition table has a size of 128 bytes.
The UEFI specification stipulates that a minimum of 16,384 bytes, regardless of sector size, are allocated for the Partition Entry Array. Thus, on a disk with 512-byte sectors, at least 32 sectors are used for the Partition Entry Array, and the first usable block is at LBA 34 or higher, while on a 4,096-byte sectors disk, at least 4 sectors are used for the Partition Entry Array, and the first usable block is at LBA 6 or higher.

MBR variants

Protective MBR (LBA 0) 
For limited backward compatibility, the space of the legacy Master Boot Record (MBR) is still reserved in the GPT specification, but it is now used in a way that prevents MBR-based disk utilities from misrecognizing and possibly overwriting GPT disks. This is referred to as a protective MBR.

A single partition of type , encompassing the entire GPT drive (where "entire" actually means as much of the drive as can be represented in an MBR), is indicated and identifies it as GPT. Operating systems and tools which cannot read GPT disks will generally recognize the disk as containing one partition of unknown type and no empty space, and will typically refuse to modify the disk unless the user explicitly requests and confirms the deletion of this partition. This minimizes accidental erasures. Furthermore, GPT-aware OSes may check the protective MBR and if the enclosed partition type is not of type  or if there are multiple partitions defined on the target device, the OS may refuse to manipulate the partition table.

If the actual size of the disk exceeds the maximum partition size representable using the legacy 32-bit LBA entries in the MBR partition table, the recorded size of this partition is clipped at the maximum, thereby ignoring the rest of the disk. This amounts to a maximum reported size of 2 TiB, assuming a disk with 512 bytes per sector (see 512e). It would result in 16 TiB with 4 KiB sectors (4Kn), but since many older operating systems and tools are hard coded for a sector size of 512 bytes or are limited to 32-bit calculations, exceeding the 2 TiB limit could cause compatibility problems.

Hybrid MBR (LBA 0 + GPT) 
In operating systems that support GPT-based boot through BIOS services rather than EFI, the first sector may also still be used to store the first stage of the bootloader code, but modified to recognize GPT partitions. The bootloader in the MBR must not assume a sector size of 512 bytes.

Partition table header (LBA 1) 

The partition table header defines the usable blocks on the disk. It also defines the number and size of the partition entries that make up the partition table (offsets 80 and 84 in the table).

Partition entries (LBA 2–33) 

After the header, the Partition Entry Array describes partitions, using a minimum size of 128 bytes for each entry block. The starting location of the array on disk, and the size of each entry, are given in the GPT header. The first 16 bytes of each entry designate the partition type's globally unique identifier (GUID). The second 16 bytes are a GUID unique to the partition. Then follow the starting and ending 64 bit LBAs, partition attributes, and the 36 character (max.) Unicode partition name. As is the nature and purpose of GUIDs and as per RFC 4122, no central registry is needed to ensure the uniqueness of the GUID partition type designators.

The 64-bit partition table attributes are shared between 48-bit common attributes for all partition types, and 16-bit type-specific attributes:

Microsoft defines the type-specific attributes for basic data partition as:

Google defines the type-specific attributes for ChromeOS kernel as:

Operating-system support

UNIX and Unix-like systems

Windows: 32-bit versions
Windows 7 and earlier do not support UEFI on 32-bit platforms, and therefore do not allow booting from GPT partitions.

Windows: 64-bit versions
Limited to 128 partitions per disk.

Partition type GUIDs 
Each partition has a "partition type GUID" that identifies the type of the partition and therefore partitions of the same type will all have the same "partition type GUID". Each partition also has a "partition unique GUID" as a separate entry, which as the name implies is a unique id for each partition.

See also 

 Advanced Active Partition (AAP)
 Apple Partition Map (APM)
 Boot Engineering Extension Record (BEER)
 BSD disklabel
 Device Configuration Overlay (DCO)
 Extended Boot Record (EBR)
 Host Protected Area (HPA)
 Partition alignment
 Rigid Disk Block (RDB)
 Volume Table of Contents (VTOC)

Notes

References

External links 
 Microsoft TechNet: Disk Sectors on GPT Disks (archived page)
 Microsoft Windows Deployment: Converting MBR to GPT without dats loss
 Microsoft TechNet: Troubleshooting Disks and File Systems 
 Microsoft TechNet: Using GPT Drives
 Microsoft: FAQs on Using GPT disks in Windows
 Microsoft Technet: How Basic Disks and Volumes Work  A bit MS-specific but good figures relate GPT to older MBR format and protective-MBR, shows layouts of complete disks, and how to interpret partition-table hexdumps.
 Apple Developer Connection: Secrets of the GPT
 Make the most of large drives with GPT and Linux
 Convert Windows Vista SP1+ or 7 x86_64 boot from BIOS-MBR mode to UEFI-GPT mode without Reinstall
 Support for GPT (Partition scheme) and HDD greater than 2.19 TB in Microsoft Windows XP
 Setting up a RAID volume in Linux with >2TB disks

BIOS
Unified Extensible Firmware Interface
Booting
Disk partitions